Mountain View Christian Academy is a private K-12 Christian school founded in 1982 and located in Bryant, Alabama, USA. The school is accredited through the Association of Christian Teachers and Schools (ACTS) and is also a member of the Association of Christian Schools International.

Church affiliation
Mountain View Christian Academy is a non-denominational ministry of the Mountain View Church of God.

References

External links
Mountain View Christian Academy website

Christian schools in Alabama
Educational institutions established in 1982
Private elementary schools in Alabama
Private high schools in Alabama
Schools in Jackson County, Alabama
Private middle schools in Alabama
Nondenominational Christian schools in the United States
1982 establishments in Alabama